Gayton is a village in Wirral, Merseyside, England.  It contains four buildings that are recorded in the National Heritage List for England as designated listed buildings.   Of these, two are listed at Grade II*, the middle of the three grades, and the others are at Grade II, the lowest grade.  The listed buildings consist of a country house, a dovecote, a farmhouse, and a former windmill.

Key

Buildings

References

Citations

Sources

Listed buildings in Merseyside
Lists of listed buildings in Merseyside